The Artillery is a formation of the Singapore Army, comprising four active battalions—the 21st, 22nd, 23rd and 24th Battalions—and an undisclosed number of reservist battalions. The primary role of the Artillery formation is to deliver timely, accurate and effective fire in support of the manoeuvre force to accomplish missions. As an indirect fire support system, the gunners rely on the forward observer and target acquisition elements to provide the target's location, which is then passed to the command post to direct the gunners to fire. 

The unofficial motto of the Artillery formation is "Once a Gunner, Always a Gunner!"

History
The Artillery formation traces its origins to 22 February 1888, when it was created as the Singapore Volunteer Artillery Corps by the British Armed Forces. 

After Singapore gained its independence in 1965, Minister for Defence Goh Keng Swee tasked Captain Mancharan Singh Gill with building up an artillery battalion for the Singapore Armed Forces (SAF). 

On 1 June 1967, the 20th People's Defence Force (Artillery) was redesignated as the 20th Singapore Artillery Battalion (20 SAB) and assigned to operate the 120mm Light Tampella Mortar, which Artillery units were subsequently equipped with in the 1970s.

In 1978, the Artillery Training Centre (ARTC) was created to replace the Artillery Reserve Administrative to meet the training requirements of reservists. 

Since 1988, the Artillery formation has undergone rapid modernisation in training, operations and weapons development when the Singapore Armed Forces partnered with ST Kinetics and Defence Science and Technology Agency (DSTA) to acquire and/or develop new equipment such as the Field Howitzer 88 and SAFARI Weapon Locating Radar.

From 2007 to 2013, the Singapore Artillery contributed to United Nations peacekeeping operations by deploying 492 personnel and radar-locating weapons to Afghanistan.

Organisation 
Gunners in the Artillery formation have different specialisations. Gunners using the M142 HIMARS, SSPH Primus, SLWH Pegasus and Field Howitzer 2000 batteries are trained to maintain and operate the weapon systems to deliver precision fire. Gunners in the STrike ObserveR Mission (STORM) batteries are in charge of coordinating air strikes and artillery fire to deliver maximum damage to enemies in a target area. Gunners in the Field Artillery Target Acquisition batteries maintain and operate radars designed to locate enemy artillery and provide early warnings or opportunities to counter-fire on the enemy artillery. Gunners in the Field Artillery Meteorological System sections specialise in providing timely and accurate atmospheric data, such as wind speed and direction, in order to increase the accuracy of artillery fire.

Equipment

References 

Formations of the Singapore Army
Military units and formations established in 1888